Grosmont is a locality located within Athabasca County in Alberta, Canada.

The community was so named on account of a nearby hill, Grosmont meaning "big mountain" in French. The locality shares its name with the Grosmont Formation, a stratigraphical unit of the Western Canadian Sedimentary Basin, and the Imperial Grosmont No. 1 well.

See also 
List of communities in Alberta

References 

Localities in Athabasca County